Givoletto is a comune (municipality) in the Metropolitan City of Turin in the Italian region Piedmont, located about  northwest of Turin.

Givoletto is home to the Madonna della Neve Natural Preserve, established to preserve the Euphorbia gibelliana, a plant which grows only in this area. 

In the winter the city usually have some snowy days, and also many days with negative temperatures.

References

Cities and towns in Piedmont